The Singapore Institute of Technology (SIT or Singaporetech) is a public autonomous university in Singapore. The university offers industry-focused, applied degree programmes; it confers its own degree programmes as well as specialised degree programmes with overseas universities.

The university's degree programmes are grouped into five clusters: Engineering (ENG), Chemical Engineering and Food Technology (CEFT), Infocomm Technology (ICT), Health and Social Sciences (HSS), and Design and Specialised Businesses (DSB).

The university's main campus is located at 10 Dover Drive, Singapore 138683 in Dover. The other 5 campuses are located in the 5 local polytechnics. In 2023, SIT will have a new centralised campus in Punggol located next to the new Punggol Coast MRT station. The university will be integrated with Punggol Digital District built by JTC Corporation in Punggol Downtown and Northshore district.

History

Beginnings 
In 2005, the Polytechnic-Foreign Specialised Institutions (Poly-FSI) initiative was introduced by the Ministry of Education. Its aim was to encourage polytechnics to partner with overseas universities to offer degree programmes in niche areas that also supported Singapore's economic development. Their findings supported the establishment of a dedicated publicly funded institute that would bring in overseas university partners to Singapore.

Establishment 
In 2009, the university was founded by then SIT president Tan Chin Tiong. He was previously a deputy president at the Singapore Management University. In 2013, Tan stepped down as SIT president and returned to the Singapore Management University as an advisor and Professor. Tan Thiam Soon took over the reins from him.

Singapore Institute of Technology Bill
In 2014, a bill was passed in the Parliament of Singapore conferring the university autonomous status and allowing it to confer its own degrees. SIT will partner overseas universities to build upon their capabilities while offering new applied degrees in SIT's name. SIT is also required to constantly refresh its programmes in accordance with Singapore's developments, economy and society.

Admission
SIT accepts applicants with diplomas from the 5 local Polytechnics, NUS High School, 2 local Arts Institutions, A levels and International Baccalaureate (IB) Qualifications. SAT scores are also considered. Adult learners may also apply for admission. Beside grades, applicants are admitted based on experiences, co-curricula activities and passion for the degree programmes.

In 2017, 14,000 applicants competed for 2,600 places in 41 degree programmes. 80 per cent of applicants were polytechnic diploma holders and 17 per cent were A-level holders.

SIT Programme Clusters

Engineering
The Bachelor of Engineering (Honours) and Master of Engineering Technology (MEngTech) in Sustainable Infrastructure Engineering (Land/Building Services) offered from Academic Year 2014/15.

Chemical Engineering and Food Technology

Infocomm Technology
The Bachelor of Engineering (Honours) in Information and Communications Technology (Information Security/Software Engineering) was offered from Academic Year 2014/15.

Health and Social Sciences

Design and Specialised Businesses
The Bachelor of Accountancy (Honours) was offered from Academic Year 2014/15.

Overseas University Partners
SIT engages with overseas universities to jointly offer the following programmes:

Research 
Enterprise & Innovation Hub (E&I Hub) was launched to help industries to work with SIT students, faculty and professional officers to manage industry projects and projects developed through the Integrated Work Study Programme.

Campus buildings 
SIT's main campus is located at the SIT@Dover, 10 Dover Drive, Singapore 138683. The main office deals with student matters, undergraduate admission matters, financial aid, scholarships, and pre-matriculated students.

The degrees directly offered by the institute are conducted at SIT@Dover. For degrees with overseas university partners (OU), students study in any of the five satellite campuses island-wide, which are based at the polytechnics.

SIT will have a new centralised campus in Punggol next to the new Punggol Coast MRT station, which is slated to be completed by 2023.

Besides SIT@Dover, SIT has campuses at the various polytechnics in Singapore.
 SIT@NYP (Nanyang Polytechnic)
 SIT@NP (Ngee Ann Polytechnic)
 SIT@SP (Singapore Polytechnic)
 SIT@TP (Temasek Polytechnic)
 SIT@RP (Republic Polytechnic)

References

External links
 Singapore Institute of Technology

2009 establishments in Singapore
Educational institutions established in 2009
Education in Singapore
Autonomous Universities in Singapore